Joseph Purdy Homestead is a historic home located in Purdy's, Westchester County, New York. It was built in 1776 and consists of an "L" shaped, -story main block attached to which are several 1-story wings.  The main block measures six bays wide.  It features a five-bay, 1-story porch along the front elevation added about 1870.

In November 2011, Purdy's announced plans to be turned into a family restaurant, specializing in fish dishes and home-grown vegetables. The restaurant, known as “Purdys Farmer & The Fish,” opened in Spring 2012.

It was added to the National Register of Historic Places in 1973.

See also
National Register of Historic Places listings in northern Westchester County, New York

References

Houses on the National Register of Historic Places in New York (state)
Houses completed in 1776
Houses in Westchester County, New York
National Register of Historic Places in Westchester County, New York